Holwell is a locality and small rural community in the local government areas of West Tamar and Latrobe, in the Launceston and North-west and west regions of Tasmania. A small part of the locality is in the Latrobe Council area. The 2016 census determined a population of 65 for the state suburb of Holwell.

History
Holwell Post Office opened in 1891 and closed in 1970. Early public buildings included a Wesleyan chapel and a school.

Road infrastructure
The C715 route (Holwell Road) runs south-west from the West Tamar Highway and passes through the locality to an intersection with the B71 route.

References

Localities of West Tamar Council
Localities of Latrobe Council
Towns in Tasmania